The National Library of Cape Verde is located in Praia, Cape Verde. The library was established in 1999. The library maintains the National Bibliography, contains the country's historical archives and the theses and dissertation bank and is a legal deposit. It also serves as the public library of Praia, the country's capital.

Projects
In 2001, the library established the Institute of the National Library and the Book (Instituto da Biblioteca Nacional e do Livro) which aims to promote literacy, particularly among children and young adults. According to the United Nations, as of 2015 approximately 86 percent of adult Cape Verdeans are literate. The project also works to disperse texts throughout the country and support national authors. The library has a partnership with the country's municipal libraries to create National Network Public Libraries, a national bibliographic digital database and online public access catalog.

See also
 Arquivo Histórico Nacional (Cape Verde)
List of buildings and structures in Santiago, Cape Verde

References

External links
Official website
  (Includes information about the national library)

Cape Verde
Buildings and structures in Praia
Education in Santiago, Cape Verde
1999 establishments in Cape Verde
Library buildings completed in 1999
Libraries established in 1999
Libraries in Cape Verde